The Parang River, also called Para River and Pare Chu is an upstream tributary of the Sutlej River, that originates in the Indian state of Himachal Pradesh and ends in Himachal Pradesh again, but flows through Ladakh and Tibet before doing so. The origin of the river is near the Parang La pass in the Spiti subdistrict. After its circuitous journey, it joins the Spiti River near Sumdo in Himachal Pradesh and the combined river then joins Sutlej.

Name 
The name "Para River", which becomes Pare Chu in Tibetan, is based on the shepherds' ground of Para in Karab-Bargyok (in the Tibetan part of its course). In Kinnauri, the river was called Parati. The Tibetans and Ladakhis were more likely to call it by the name of locale above their own, as the "Rupshu river" or "Tsotso river", Tsotso being the name of the valley in West Tibet through which it flows.

Henry Strachey regarded it as the western headwater of Sutlej River, and called it "Rupshu Sutlej" or "Tsotso Sutlej".

Course 

The Parang River originates in Spiti and ends in Spiti, taking a circuitous route through Ladakh and Ngari Khorsum (West Tibet). British geographer Alexander Cunningham wries:

Interestingly, Spiti River flows by the Parang Pass only 10 km to its west. The Parang River joins it about 80 km downstream at Sumdo, near the Tibet border.

Cunningham states that the Spiti and Parang rivers are roughly equal in volume. But Parang is only a "very large rushing torrent" while Spiti is very deep rapid river.

Notes

References

Bibliography

External links 
 The Para River basin marked on OpenStreetMap.

Rivers of Himachal Pradesh
Rivers of Ladakh
Rivers of Tibet
Indus basin